Paul Clammer is an English travel writer best known for books on challenging destinations including Haiti, Sudan and Afghanistan. Clammer is the co-author of several guide books for Lonely Planet and the founder of Kabul Caravan, a highly respected website focussing on helping travellers visit Afghanistan.  Clammer attended St Ivo School, Cambridgeshire and Bristol University.

References

Living people
English travel writers
People educated at St Ivo School
English male non-fiction writers
Year of birth missing (living people)